Romania competed at the 2013 Summer Universiade in Kazan, Russia.

Medalists

Athletics

Men

Women

Basketball

Romania qualified both a men's and a women's team.

Men
The men's team participated in Group B.

Team roster
The men's team roster was as follows:

|}
| valign="top" |
 Head coach
 Assistant coach(es)
 Team Physician
 Athletic Trainer

Legend
 (C) Team captain
 nat field describes country of university
 Age field is age on July 7, 2013
|}

Preliminary round

|}

Note: The Philippines were disqualified because of leaving the tournament before the quarterfinal round. All their matches were cancelled and assigned defeats by 0–20.

Quarterfinals

Semifinal round

5th–8th place

Judo

Men

Women

Fencing

Women

Gymnastics

Artistic

Men

Swimming

Men

Weightlifting

Men

Women

Wrestling

Men's freestyle

References

2013 in Romanian sport
Nations at the 2013 Summer Universiade
Romania at the Summer Universiade